The 2020 Conservative Party of Canada leadership election was a leadership election held to elect a successor to Andrew Scheer, who in December 2019 announced his pending resignation as leader of the Conservative Party of Canada. The election was conducted by postal ballot from mid-July to 21 August 2020, with the ballots processed and results announced on 23–24 August 2020. The $300,000 entrance fee made it the most expensive leadership race in the history of Canadian politics.

Four candidates were running for the position: member of parliament and former veterans affairs minister Erin O'Toole, co-founder of the Conservative Party Peter MacKay, Toronto lawyer Leslyn Lewis and member of parliament Derek Sloan.

The election was originally scheduled for 27 June 2020, but on March 26, the party suspended the race due to the ongoing coronavirus pandemic crisis in Canada. Party officials said they would revisit their decision on May 1. On April 29, it was announced that the race would proceed by postal ballot with the election itself being rescheduled from June to August. To be counted, ballots needed to be completed and received by 21 August 2020 at 5:00 p.m. EDT. The leadership election results were expected to be announced on 23 August, but the first round results were not announced until the early morning on 24 August, due to machine malfunctions causing significant delays. MacKay led the first ballot with 33.52 per cent by a narrow margin of around 2 per cent. O'Toole subsequently led on the second ballot and won on the third ballot, becoming the new leader of the Conservative Party.

Campaign

Background
On 21 October 2019, the 2019 Canadian federal election was held. The Conservatives remained in opposition against a minority Liberal government. Under the Conservative Party's constitution, an election loss results in a leadership review at the next party convention. The following day, Scheer announced his intention to remain leader of the party.

As early as 23 October, there were reports that party members were already privately voicing dissatisfaction with Scheer's leadership, and suggestions that he could face a leadership challenge at the next party convention in April. By the end of the month, Conservative figures were making their criticism public, and an online petition was launched that called for Scheer to resign. Former MP and cabinet minister Peter MacKay described the election as "like having a breakaway on an open net and missing the net"; he attributed the loss to Scheer's socially conservative views, which he said "hung around [his] neck like a stinking albatross" and distracted from other policies and issues. MacKay's comments additionally fuelled speculation that he was vying for the leadership.

On 6 November, Scheer met with the Conservative caucus for the first time since the election, where they discussed the federal election and why the party failed to win. Scheer attributed the loss not to policy, but poor communication. During the meeting, the caucus voted against adopting the provisions of the Reform Act; as adopting them would have allowed the caucus to begin the process of ousting Scheer, his leadership was seen as safe until the April convention. However, criticism did not abate; a report in the Toronto Star cited calls for Scheer's resignation from within the business community, energy sector and several high-profile party insiders.

On 12 December, Scheer announced that he was stepping down as leader, pending the election of his successor. He also said he would stay on as MP for Regina—Qu'Appelle "for the near future". The leadership convention was scheduled for 27 June 2020.

Impact of the coronavirus pandemic 
The on-going COVID-19 pandemic affected the timing of the leadership election. On 12 March, Peter MacKay, Erin O'Toole, Rick Peterson and Leslyn Lewis suspended all public campaign events, while Marilyn Gladu "assess[ed] events and activities on a daily and event-by-event basis", due to public health guidelines. The next day, 13 March, Gladu, Rudy Husny and Rick Peterson called for either the race to be postponed or for entry deadlines to be pushed back. On 19 March, Husny dropped out, citing an unwillingness to fundraise during a public health emergency. Peterson followed on 20 March, criticizing the organizing committee's unwillingness to move the deadlines as unfair.

On 26 March, the Leadership Election Organizing Committee (LEOC) postponed the race, as well as cancelling debates planned for April and pushing back the membership deadline to 15 May. The LEOC did not set a new date, and said they would revisit the decision on 1 May. On 29 April, the LEOC announced the resumption of the contest, with the vote taking place entirely by mail-in ballot and without a convention. The ballot must be completed and received by 21 August. No definitive date was set for when the results would be announced, but the LEOC clarified that the results would be announced "as soon as those ballots can be properly processed and examined by scrutineers while respecting any health guidelines in place at that time."

Allegations of hacking
On 19 June, Erin O'Toole accused MacKay's campaign of theft of confidential campaign data and strategy including Zoom conference videos after discovering that their "systems were hacked earlier this week". Later that day, O'Toole filed a formal complaint and requested that the RCMP, OPP, and Toronto Police Service investigate Peter MacKay's campaign and his senior campaign staff member Jamie Lall.

On 20 June, MacKay's campaign dismissed the allegations and called them a "desperate, last ditch strategy" and "mildly amusing." Lall publicly denied the allegations in a post on his personal Twitter account.

On 22 June, the National Post reported that the O'Toole campaign received a confession letter from MP staff member implicating Lall and describing him as a "senior regional adviser to the Peter MacKay campaign." Later in the day, the RCMP released a statement saying they have begun an investigation into O'Toole's allegations against the MacKay campaign, while Lall stated that he is "aggressively pursuing" legal action against the O'Toole campaign. MacKay spokesperson Chisholm Pothier told CBC News Tuesday that the O'Toole team sent its confidential passwords and logins to more than 300 MPs and their political staff members — something Pothier said was done "negligently and with no reasonable expectation of privacy." In response, O'Toole campaign manager Fred DeLorey tweeted, "this is a willful attempt at deception. There is a big diff between sending invitees a code for specific meetings and someone breaking into the private admin and stealing all of the files. The former is standard operations, the latter is a crime. That is what is being investigated."

On 24 June, an  ex-staff member to MP Greg McLean admitted to trying to leak Erin O'Toole's confidential video records, but says the MacKay campaign turned him down, according to Toronto Star's Alex Boutilier and Kieran Leavitt. MP McLean later tweeted, "sadly, this is completely inconsistent with what was told to me and senior O'Toole officials by this young man. I know not to trust this. The police investigation will determine the truth" Erin O'Toole Campaign staff member Anthony Koch also tweeted, "how do you explain the Calgary and midtown Toronto IP addresses that accessed the zoom admin account illegally multiple times over the course of a week and downloaded over 140 unique videos?"

Timeline

2019
21 October — The 2019 Canadian federal election was held. The Conservatives remained in opposition against a minority Liberal government. Under CPC rules, a loss in an election triggers an automatic leadership review. 
22 October — CPC Leader Andrew Scheer announced he will continue as leader.
12 December — Andrew Scheer announced his pending resignation as leader of the Conservatives, Andrew Scheer will remain MP for Regina—Qu'Appelle when a new leader is elected.
21 December — The party executive announced that a national party policy convention scheduled for mid-April 2020 has been postponed until November "so greater focus could be given to the details and organization around the Conservative leadership election process."
24 December — The party announced that former Deputy Leader Lisa Raitt will co-chair the organizing committee for the leadership race. Dan Nowlan is the committee's other co-chair.

2020
13 January — Leadership election process officially commences.
27 February — Deadline for potential candidates to enter leadership election. Candidates must have, by this date, paid at least $25,000 towards their registration fee and submitted signatures of at least 1,000 party members qualified to nominate them for leader.
25 March — Deadline for candidates to meet all entry requirements, including having paid the $300,000 entrance fee and compliance deposit in full and collected signatures of 3,000 qualified party members from 30 Electoral District Associations, in at least seven provinces or territories.
26 March — Leadership race suspended indefinitely due to ongoing coronavirus pandemic crisis. Party officials said that the schedule for the debates and leadership convention would be revisited on 1 May 2020.
29 April — The party's Leadership Election Organizing Committee announced the resumption of the leadership election process, with the vote to occur via mail-in ballot that needs to be received by 21 August 2020.
15 May — New deadline to sign up as a member for purposes of voting in the leadership race. Previous deadline was 17 April 2020.
17 June — French-language debate in Toronto, moderated by Dan Nowlan and Lisa Raitt.
18 June — English-language debate in Toronto, moderated by Dan Nowlan and Lisa Raitt.
24 June — Etobicoke—Lakeshore Conservative Association debate (online)
27 June — Original date of the leadership election, postponed due to COVID-19 pandemic
8 July — Vancouver Centre Conservative Association debate via Zoom
14 July — Announcement by the party that 269,469 members are eligible to vote in the leadership race, of which about 100,000 purchased their membership since the start of 2020.
18 July — Announcement by the party that ballots have been sent out to members. 
29 July — Independent Press Gallery of Canada debate in Toronto
21 August, 5 p.m. EDT — Deadline for election ballots to be filled out and received in order to be counted. The previous date for the election had been 27 June 2020.
23–24 August — Leadership election results announcement at the Shaw Centre in Ottawa. According to the Leadership Election Organizing Committee: "The result will be announced as soon as those ballots can be properly processed and examined by scrutineers while respecting any health guidelines in place at that time." The first ballot was intended to be announced at 6:30 p.m. but was not announced after midnight EDT on 24 August, due to issues with the envelope-opening and vote counting machines. The final result and O'Toole's victory speech were delivered shortly after 1 am EDT.

Full results

Provincial summary

Debates

The fifth debate was turned into a fireside chat with the remaining two candidates after Leslyn Lewis released a statement sending her regrets due to a medical issue. Soon after Peter MacKay chose to not attend the debate.

Rules and procedures
On 11 January 2020, the party's Leadership Election Organizing Committee released the Rules and Procedures for the 2020 Leadership document. It confirmed the vote would be held under instant-runoff voting, open to those who are members of the Conservative Party of Canada as of 17 April. (This date was later pushed back to 15 May.) To appear on the ballot, a member must apply to the Leadership Candidate Nomination Committee between 13 January and 27 February, with 1,000 signatures of endorsement from party members (which must span at least 30 Electoral Districts in 7 provinces), a $25,000 installment of the registration fee and a completed 42-page Leadership Contestant Questionnaire, which requires them to declare they accept "the policies, principles, goals and objectives" of the Conservative Party. If approved by the Committees, the applicant has until 25 March to provide the remainder of the 3,000 endorsement signatures and $200,000 registration fee. In addition a $100,000 Compliance Deposit is required prior to 25 March but is returned upon completing required financial filings and adhering to Rules and Procedures document. As in the 2017 leadership election, each electoral district is given 100 points which are distributed according to weight of a candidate's vote in that electoral district, with the first candidate receiving 16,901 points wins the leadership race.

Candidates
Verified candidates are authorized contestants that have paid the full $200,000 registration fee, the entire $100,000 compliance deposit, and submitted all 3,000 required signatures of endorsement by 25 March 2020. Verified candidates have secured their name on the leadership ballot.

Approved

Leslyn Lewis

Background 
Leslyn Lewis, 49, is a Toronto lawyer and the former CPC candidate for Scarborough—Rouge Park, Ontario in the 2015 election. Leslyn Lewis holds a bachelor's degree from University of Toronto, two master's degrees, a law degree from Osgoode Hall Law School and a PhD in International Law. Leslyn Lewis is also a Vice Chair of the Ontario Trillium Foundation and Chair of the Partnership Committee.

Candidacy announced: 22 January 2020
Date registered with Elections Canada:
Campaign website: Leslyn Lewis
Campaign slogan: Courage • Compassion • Common Sense
Campaign slogan (French): Courage • Compassion • Bon Sens

Peter MacKay

Background
Peter MacKay, was the MP for Central Nova (2004–2015), and for Pictou—Antigonish—Guysborough (1997–2004). He was Minister of Justice and Attorney General (2013–2015), Minister of National Defence (2007–2013), Minister of Foreign Affairs (2006–2007), Deputy Leader of the Conservative Party of Canada (2004–2015). He was the leader of the Progressive Conservative Party of Canada (2003) at the time of the merger. Prior to entering politics, Peter MacKay worked as a Crown Attorney.

Candidacy announced: 15 January 2020
Date registered with Elections Canada:
Campaign website: www.petermackay.ca
Campaign slogan: Unite Build Lead
Campaign slogan (French): Unir Bâtir Diriger

Erin O'Toole

Background
Erin O'Toole, is the MP for Durham (2012–present), the Shadow Minister of Foreign Affairs (2017–present), and the former Shadow Minister of Public Safety and Emergency Preparedness (2015–2016) and Minister of Veterans Affairs (2015). He placed third in the 2017 Conservative leadership election. Prior to entering politics, Erin O'Toole served in the Royal Canadian Air Force, where he held the rank of Captain, and was a lawyer after completing military service.

Candidacy announced: 25 January 2020
Date registered with Elections Canada:
Campaign website: www.erinotoole.ca
Campaign slogan: True Blue Leadership
Campaign slogan (French): Un Vrai Bleu
{{Endorsements box
|df=yes| title = Endorsements of Erin O'Toole
| list =
MPs: (38)
Michael Barrett (MP for Leeds—Grenville—Thousand Islands and Rideau Lakes; Shadow Minister for Ethics)
Bob Benzen (MP for Calgary Heritage)
Kenny Chiu (MP for Steveston—Richmond East; Deputy Shadow Minister for International Development)
Marc Dalton (MP for Pitt Meadows—Maple Ridge; Deputy Shadow Minister for Indigenous Services)
Raquel Dancho (MP for Kildonan—St. Paul; Shadow Minister for Diversity and Inclusion and Youth)
Kerry Diotte (MP for Edmonton Griesbach)
Eric Duncan (MP for Stormont—Dundas—South Glengarry; Deputy Shadow Minister for Democratic Institutions)
Dave Epp (MP for Chatham-Kent—Leamington; Deputy Shadow Minister for Foreign Affairs)
Garnett Genuis (MP for Sherwood Park—Fort Saskatchewan; Shadow Minister for Multiculturalism)
Tracy Gray (MP for Kelowna—Lake Country; Shadow Minister for Interprovincial Trade)
Pat Kelly (MP for Calgary Rocky Ridge; Shadow Minister for Finance (Associate))
Peter Kent (MP for Thornhill; Shadow Minister for Immigration, Refugees and Citizenship)
Robert Kitchen (MP for Souris—Moose Mountain)
Damien Kurek (MP for Battle River—Crowfoot; Deputy Shadow Minister for Rural Economic Development)
Stephanie Kusie (MP for Calgary Midnapore; Shadow Minister for Families, Children and Social Development)
Philip Lawrence (MP for Northumberland—Peterborough South)
Dane Lloyd (MP for Sturgeon River—Parkland)
Larry Maguire (MP for Brandon—Souris; Deputy Shadow Minister for Immigration, Refugees and Citizenship)
Richard Martel (MP for Chicoutimi—Le Fjord; Shadow Minister for National Defence (Associate))
Dan Mazier (MP for Dauphin—Swan River—Neepawa; Deputy Shadow Minister for Environment and Climate Change)
Greg McLean (MP for Calgary Centre; Deputy Shadow Minister for National Revenue)
Cathy McLeod (MP for Kamloops—Thompson—Cariboo; Shadow Minister for Natural Resources (Forestry and Mining))
Eric Melillo (MP for Kenora; Deputy Shadow Minister for Democratic Institutions)
Rob Morrison (MP for Kootenay—Columbia; Deputy Shadow Minister for Public Safety and Emergency Preparedness)
Brad Redekopp (MP for Saskatoon West)
Blake Richards (MP for Banff—Airdrie; Shadow Minister for Tourism and Western Economic Diversification)
Lianne Rood (MP for Lambton—Kent—Middlesex; Deputy Shadow Minister for Agriculture and Agri-Food)
Alex Ruff (MP for Bruce—Grey—Owen Sound; retired Canadian Armed Forces Colonel)
Jamie Schmale (MP for Haliburton—Kawartha Lakes—Brock; Shadow Minister for Crown-Indigenous Relations)
Martin Shields (MP for Bow River; Deputy Shadow Minister for Seniors)
Gerald Soroka (MP for Yellowhead; Deputy Shadow Minister for Natural Resources (Forestry and Mining))
Bruce Stanton (MP for Simcoe North; Deputy Speaker of the House of Commons)
Warren Steinley (MP for Regina—Lewvan; Deputy Shadow Minister for Treasury Board)
David Sweet (MP for Flamborough—Glanbrook; Shadow Minister for International Human Rights and Religious Freedom)
Corey Tochor (MP for Saskatoon—University; Deputy Shadow Minister for Intergovernmental Affairs)
Tako Van Popta (MP for Langley—Aldergrove)
Gary Vidal (MP for Desnethé—Missinippi—Churchill River; Shadow Minister for Indigenous Services)
Brad Vis (MP for Mission—Matsqui—Fraser Canyon; Deputy Shadow Minister for Employment, Workforce Development and Disability Inclusion)

Senators: (3)
Leo Housakos, (Senator for Quebec, Speaker of the Senate) 
Judith Seidman (Senator for Quebec)
Larry Smith, (Senator for Quebec, Former Leader of the Opposition in the Senate)

Provincial & territorial politicians: (44)
Aris Babikian (Ontario MPP for Scarborough—Agincourt (provincial electoral district))
Toby Barrett (Ontario MPP for Haldimand—Norfolk)
Peter Bethlenfalvy (Ontario MPP for Pickering—Uxbridge and President of the Treasury Board) 
Steven Bonk (Saskatchewan MLA for Moosomin)
David Buckingham (Saskatchewan MLA for Saskatoon Westview)
Stan Cho (Ontario MPP for Willowdale)
Lorne Coe (Ontario MPP for Whitby and Chief Government Whip)
Dan D'Autremont (Saskatchewan MLA for Cannington and Speaker of the Legislative Assembly of Saskatchewan)
Christine Elliott (Deputy Premier of Ontario and Ontario MPP for Newmarket—Aurora)
Mike Ellis (Alberta MLA for Calgary-West and Deputy Leader of the United Conservative Party)
Vic Fedeli (Ontario MPP for Nipissing and Minister of Economic Development, Job Creation and Trade)
Amy Fee (Ontario MPP for Kitchener South—Hespeler)
Muhammad Fiaz (Saskatchewan MLA for Regina Pasqua)
Tanya Fir (Alberta MLA for Calgary-Peigan and Minister for Economic Development)
Michaela Glasgo (Alberta MLA for Brooks-Medicine Hat)
Stacey Hassard (Yukon MLA for Pelly-Nisutlin, Leader of the Official Opposition in Yukon; former Interim Leader of the Yukon Party, 2016-2020)
Jason Kenney (Premier of Alberta and Alberta MLA for Calgary-Lougheed)
Delbert Kirsch (Saskatchewan MLA for Batoche)
Greg Lawrence (Saskatchewan MLA for Moose Jaw Wakamow)
Kaycee Madu (Alberta MLA for Edmonton-South West and Minister of Municipal Affairs)
Gila Martow (Ontario MPP for Thornhill)
Ric McIver (Alberta MLA for Calgary-Hays and Minister of Transportation of Alberta)
Nicholas Milliken (Alberta MLA for Calgary-Currie)
Dale Nally (Alberta MLA for Morinville-St. Albert)
Rick Nicholls (Ontario MPP for Chatham-Kent—Leamington)
Demetrios Nicolaides (Alberta MLA for Calgary-Bow and Alberta Minister of Advanced Education)
Jason Nixon (Alberta MLA for Rimbey-Rocky Mountain House-Sundre)
Jeremy Nixon (Alberta MLA for Calgary-Klein)
Lindsey Park (Ontario MPP for Durham)
David Piccini (Ontario MPP for Northumberland—Peterborough South)
Josephine Pon (Alberta MLA for Calgary-Beddington and Alberta Minister of Seniors and Housing)
Jeremy Roberts (Ontario MPP for Ottawa West—Nepean)
Miranda Rosin (Alberta MLA for Banff-Kananaskis)
Laura Ross (Saskatchewan MLA for Regina Qu'Appelle Valley)
Rajan Sawhney (Alberta MLA for Calgary-North East and Minister of Community and Social Services of Alberta)
Rebecca Schulz (Alberta MLA for Calgary-Shaw and Minister of Children Services)
Tyler Shandro (Alberta MLA for Calgary-Acadia and Minister of Health of Alberta)
Dave Smith (Ontario MPP for Peterborough—Kawartha) 
Lyle Stewart (Saskatchewan MLA for Lumsden-Morse)
Christine Tell (Saskatchewan MLA for Regina Wascana Plains)
Lisa Thompson (Ontario MPP for Huron—Bruce and Minister of Government and Consumer Services) 
Bill Walker (Ontario MPP for Bruce—Grey—Owen Sound) 
Rick Wilson (Alberta MLA for Maskwacis-Wetaskiwin)
Colleen Young (Saskatchewan MLA for Lloydminster)
Municipal politicians: (1)
Michael Harris (Waterloo Regional Councillor for Cambridge, former Ontario MPP for Kitchener—Conestoga, 2011–2018)
Former MPs: (4) 
Alupa Clarke (MP for Beauport—Limoilou, 2015–2019)
Christian Paradis (MP for Mégantic—L'Érable, 2006-2015, Minister of Industry, 2011-2013, Minister for International Cooperation, 2013-2015, Minister for La Francophonie, 2013-2015)
Gerry Ritz (MP for Battlefords—Lloydminster 1997-2017, Minister of Agriculture and Agri-Food 2007-2015)
Chuck Strahl (MP for Fraser Valley East, 1993–1997, Fraser Valley, 1997–2004 and Chilliwack—Fraser Canyon, 2004–2011)Former Senators: (1)
Kelvin Ogilvie (Senator for Nova Scotia, 2009-2017, and former President of Acadia University)Former provincial politicians: (1)
Linda Johnson (Former Alberta MLA for Calgary-Glenmore)Former municipal politicians: (1)
Yves Lévesque (Former Mayor of Trois-Rivières, Quebec, 2001-2018)Other prominent individuals: (4)Diane Francis (US-born Canadian journalist, author and editor-at-large for the National Post)
Vincenzo Guzzo (CEO of Cinémas Guzzo, Groupe Guzzo Construction inc., Guzzo Medical, and Guzzo Hospitality)
W. Brett Wilson (Panelist on CBC Television's Dragons' Den)Organizations:Media:Total endorsements: 97
}}

Derek Sloan

Background
Derek Sloan, is the MP for Hastings—Lennox and Addington (2019–present). Prior to entering politics, Derek Sloan worked as a lawyer in private practice.Candidacy announced: 22 January 2020Date registered with Elections Canada:Campaign website: Campaign slogan: Conservative. Without ApologyCampaign slogan (French): Conservateur Sans Se Dérober

Withdrew or failed to qualify

Failed to qualify as authorized contestants
Approved applicants who failed to pass the second qualification stage that required 2,000 signatures and the submission of the full $100,000 compliance fee and at least $50,000 of the entrance fee by 25 March 2020 or who disqualified between Stage 1 and Stage 2.

Marilyn Gladu

Background
Marilyn Gladu, 57, is the MP for Sarnia—Lambton (2015–present), and was the Shadow Minister of Health (2017–2020), Shadow Minister of Science (2015–2017). Prior to entering politics, she was an engineer for Dow Chemical.Candidacy announced: 9 January 2020Candidacy suspended: 25 March 2020Date registered with Elections Canada:Campaign website: https://www.marilyngladu.ca

Rudy Husny
Background
Rudy Husny is Director of Stakeholder Relations in the Office of the Leader of the Official Opposition and candidate in Outremont in 2011 and 2015.Candidacy announced: 8 February 2020Candidacy suspended: 19 March 2020

Withdrew due to tight election timeline and rules. Husny cited the ongoing COVID-19 pandemic crisis as his stated reason for suspending his campaign, saying it is just not right to ask people for money during a public health emergency.Date registered with Elections Canada:Campaign website: 

Jim Karahalios
Background
Jim Karahalios is a corporate lawyer and founder of activist groups "Axe The Carbon Tax" and "Take Back Our PC Party". He sued the Ontario PC party after narrowly losing an election in November 2018 for party president, but the case has not yet been tried. He is accusing the Ontario PC party of ballot stuffing in that election.

Karahalios obtained the required 3,000 verified signatures and collected $300,000 for the entrance fee, but CPC officers refused to put his name on the ballot. The exact reasons for Karahalios's disqualification were not released. Karahalios contested the disqualification in court. On 20 May 2020, the Ontario Superior Court of Justice reinstated his candidacy. The judge's decision was made on the basis that the subcommittee which disqualified Karahalios did not have the authority to do so. The day after Karahalios was reinstated as a candidate, he was disqualified by the leadership election organizing committee (LEOC), a body which the judge stated had the authority to disqualify  candidates.Candidacy announced: 28 January 2020Disqualified: 20 March 2020Reinstated by court: 20 May 2020Disqualified: 21 May 2020Date registered with Elections Canada:Campaign website: Jim Karahalios for Conservative Party Leader

Rick Peterson

Background
Rick Peterson, is a venture capitalist, party fundraiser, principal of Peterson Capital, and a former candidate for leadership of the British Columbia Conservative Party. He was a member of the Progressive Conservatives at the time of the merger. He ran and placed 12th in the 2017 Conservative leadership election.Candidacy announced: 22 January 2020Candidacy suspended: 20 March 2020
Withdrew due to tight election timeline and rules. Peterson also cited the ongoing COVID-19 pandemic crisis as his stated reason for suspending his campaign. Endorsed Peter MacKay.Date registered with Elections Canada:Campaign website: 

Failed to qualify as approved applicants
Declared candidates who failed to pass the first qualification stage by obtaining at least 1,000 signatures, submit at least $25,000 of the entrance fee by 27 February 2020 and/or pass the vetting process.

Richard Décarie
Background
Richard Décarie, was the Deputy Chief of Staff to then-Opposition Leader Stephen Harper and Chief of Staff & Senior Advisor to then-Premier Jean Charest.Candidacy announced: 30 January 2020 
NotesDécarie advocated for social conservative values.  "I think 'LGBTQ' is a Liberal term. I don't talk about people that way, I talk about persons, and I think we all need the full respect for being a human being." When asked by an interviewer whether "being gay" was a "choice" or not, Décarie said that it was. This answer lead to calls by Kory Teneycke, a former senior aide to both Stephen Harper and Doug Ford, that he be barred from running. Décarie acquired the required number of signatures and paid the deposit but was disqualified by the party following his interview with the nomination committee. Endorsed Derek Sloan.

Clayton Knutzon
Background 
Clayton Knutzon is a former Freedom Conservative Party candidate in Alberta.Candidacy announced: 22 December 2019

Bobby Singh
Background 
Bobby Singh is a Toronto businessman and the former CPC candidate for Scarborough—Rouge Park, Ontario in the 2019 election. Endorsed Peter MacKay.Candidacy announced: 15 January 2020

Irvin Studin
Background
Irvin Studin is a senior fellow at the University of Toronto's Munk School of Global Affairs and Public Policy, a Rhodes Scholar, former professional soccer player with the Toronto Lynx, and served in the Privy Council Office between 2002 and 2006.Candidacy announced: 25 February 2020

Withdrawn prior to 27 February 2020

Bryan Brulotte
Background
CEO and chair of employment firm MaxSys Staffing and Consulting (1993–present), deputy chief of staff to Paul Dick (1993), Progressive Conservative candidate for Lanark-Carleton in 2000.Candidacy announced: 16 December 2019Candidacy suspended: 14 January 2020Campaign Website: www.bryanbrulotte.ca
Notes
Withdrew following the release of the leadership election rules. Endorsed Peter MacKay.

Aron Seal

Aron Seal, a former policy advisor to Prime Minister Stephen Harper, Director of Policy for Tony Clement and Jim Flaherty.Candidacy announced: 22 October 2019 Candidacy suspended: 25 February 2020Campaign website: 
Notes
Withdrew saying that new signature requirements and deadlines were "designed to keep outsider candidates out". Endorsed Rudy Husny.

DeclinedRona Ambrose – Interim Leader of the CPC and Leader of the Official Opposition (2015–2017), MP for Sturgeon River—Parkland (2015–2017) and Edmonton—Spruce Grove, Alberta (2004–2015), Minister of Health (2013–2015), Minister of Public Works and Government Services (2010–2013), Minister of Labour (2008–2010), Minister of Intergovernmental Affairs (2007–2008), Minister of the Environment (2006–2007)John Baird – MP for Ottawa West—Nepean, Ontario (2006–2015), Minister of Foreign Affairs (2011–2015), Leader of the Government in the House of Commons (2010–2011), Minister of the Environment (2007–2008, 2010–2011), Minister of Transport (2008–2010), President of the Treasury Board, (2006–2007), Ontario Progressive Conservative Party MPP (1995–2005) and provincial cabinet minister (1999–2003).Candice Bergen  – Opposition House Leader (2016–present), Shadow Minister for Natural Resources (2015–2016), Minister of State for Social Development (2013–2015), MP for Portage—Lisgar, Manitoba (2008–present)Maxime Bernier – Leader of the People's Party (2018–present), Shadow Minister of Innovation, Science and Economic Development (2015–2016, 2017–2018), Minister of State for Small Business, Tourism and Agriculture (2011–2015), Minister of Foreign Affairs (2007–2008), and Minister of Industry (2006–2007), MP for Beauce, Quebec (2006–2019), placed second in the 2017 Conservative leadership electionJean Charest – Premier of Quebec (2003–2012), Leader of the Quebec Liberal Party (1998–2012), Leader of the Progressive Conservative Party of Canada (1993–1998), Deputy Prime Minister of Canada (1993), Minister of the Environment (1991–1993), MP for Sherbrooke (1984–1998)Michael Chong – Shadow Minister of Democratic Institutions (2019–present), Shadow Minister of Science (2018–2019), Shadow Minister of Infrastructure and Communities (2017–2018), Shadow Minister of Urban Affairs (2017–2018), Deputy Shadow Minister of the Environment (2015–2016), Minister of Intergovernmental Affairs (2006), Minister of State (Sport) (2006), MP for Wellington—Halton Hills, Ontario (2004–present), placed fifth in the 2017 Conservative leadership electionChristy Clark – Premier of British Columbia (2011–2017), Leader of the British Columbia Liberal Party (2011–2017)Gérard Deltell – Shadow Minister of Intergovernmental Affairs (2019–present), Shadow President of the Treasury Board (2017–2019), Shadow Minister of Finance (2016–2017), Shadow Minister of Employment, Workforce Development, and Labour (2015–2016), MP for Louis-Saint-Laurent, Quebec (2015–present), Quebec MNA for Chauveau (2008–2015) and leader of the Action démocratique du Québec (2009–2012)Mario Dumont - Leader of the Official Opposition of Québec (2007–2008), Leader of the Action Démocratique du Québec (1994–2009), MNA for Rivière-du-Loup (1994–2009). Endorsed MacKayMichael Fortier – Minister of International Trade (2008), Minister of Public Works and Government Services (2006–2008), Senator from Quebec (2006–2008), placed fifth in the 1998 Progressive Conservative leadership electionVincenzo Guzzo – Entrepreneur, philanthropist, and television personality (Dragons' Den); CEO of Cinémas Guzzo, Groupe Guzzo Construction Inc., Guzzo Medical and Guzzo HospitalityStephen Harper – Prime Minister of Canada (2006–2015), Leader of the Conservative Party of Canada (2004–2015), Leader of the Canadian Alliance (2002–2003), MP for Calgary Southwest/Calgary Heritage (2002–2016), MP for Calgary West (1993–1997)Jason Kenney – Premier of Alberta (2019–present), Leader of the United Conservative Party (2017–present), Leader of the Progressive Conservative Association of Alberta (2017), and Alberta MLA for Calgary-Lougheed (2017–present), Minister of National Defence (2015), Minister of Employment and Social Development (2013–2015), Minister of Citizenship, Immigration and Multiculturalism (2008–2013), MP for Calgary Midnapore, Alberta (2015–2016) and Calgary Southeast, Alberta (1997–2015). Initially endorsed Ambrose; after she declined to enter the race, endorsed O'Toole.Bernard Lord – Premier of New Brunswick (1999–2006), Leader of the Progressive Conservative Party of New Brunswick (1997–2006)Caroline Mulroney – Ontario Minister of Transportation (2019–present), Ontario Minister of Francophone Affairs (2018–present), Attorney General of Ontario (2018–2019), Ontario MPP for York—Simcoe (2018–present), daughter of former Prime Minister Brian Mulroney. Endorsed MacKay.Pierre Poilievre – Shadow Minister of Finance (2017–present), Shadow Minister of Employment, Workforce Development, and Labour (2016–2017), Shadow President of Treasury Board (2015–2016), Minister of Employment and Social Development (2015), Minister for Democratic Reform (2013–2015), MP for Carleton, Ontario (2015–present) and Nepean—Carleton, Ontario (2004–2015) Though expected to announce his candidacy on 26 January and reported to have formed a campaign team including John Baird as campaign chair and Leo Housakos as Quebec organizer, Poilievre announced on 23 January that he would not run for the leadership.Lisa Raitt – Deputy Leader of the CPC and Deputy Leader of the Official Opposition (2017–2019), Shadow Minister of Finance (2015–2016), Minister of Transport (2013–2015), Minister of Labour (2010–2013), Minister of Natural Resources (2008–2010), President and CEO of the Toronto Port Authority (2002–2008), MP for Milton, Ontario (2015–2019) and Halton, Ontario (2008–2015), placed eighth in the 2017 Conservative leadership electionMichelle Rempel Garner – Shadow Minister of Industry and Economic Development (2019–present), Shadow Minister of Immigration, Refugees, and Citizenship (2015–2019), Minister of Western Economic Diversification (2013–2015), MP for Calgary Nose Hill, Alberta (2015–present) and Calgary Centre-North, Alberta (2011–2015).Brad Trost – Shadow Minister of Canada–U.S. Relations (2015–2016), MP for Saskatoon—University, Saskatchewan (2015–2019) and Saskatoon—Humboldt, Saskatchewan (2004–2015), placed fourth in the 2017 Conservative leadership election Initially endorsed Décarie; after Décarie was disqualified, endorsed Sloan and Lewis.Brad Wall – Premier of Saskatchewan (2007–2018), Leader of the Saskatchewan Party (2004–2018). Endorsed Ambrose.John Williamson''' – MP for New Brunswick Southwest (2011–2015, 2019–present), director of communications for the Prime Minister's Office under Stephen Harper, national director of the Canadian Taxpayers Federation (2004–2008).

Fundraising

During the first quarter Marilyn Gladu raised $94,734, Rick Peterson raised $35,598 and Rudy Husny raised $28,941. They withdrew from the leadership race during the first quarter. Jim Karahalios raised $294,522 from 1,700 donors, but was disqualified.

Some numbers for the second quarter (April to the end of June 2020) were obtained by The Globe and Mail and confirmed with the campaigns.  The Conservative Party has not confirmed any numbers for the second quarter.  Finalized numbers must be submitted to Elections Canada at the end of July and should be available some time after.

Opinion polling

After candidate registration deadline

Conservative Party members

Conservative Party supporters

All Canadians

Before candidate registration deadline

Conservative Party supporters

All Canadians

See also

2020 Green Party of Canada leadership election

Notes

References

2020 elections in Canada
August 2020 events in Canada
2020
Elections postponed due to the COVID-19 pandemic
Conservative Party of Canada leadership election